The National Geographic GeoBee (called the National Geography Bee from 1989 to 2000 and the National Geographic Bee from 2001 to 2018, also referred to as the Nat Geo Bee) was an annual geography contest sponsored by the National Geographic Society. The bee, held annually since 1989, was open to students in the fourth through eighth grades in participating schools from the United States.

The entities represented at the national level came from all fifty U.S. states, all the territories, the Department of Defense Dependents Schools (DoDDS), and the District of Columbia.

The National Geographic Bee Finals were moderated by Jeopardy! host Alex Trebek for its first 25 years (1989–2013). At the 2013 National Geographic Bee, Trebek announced that 2013 would be his last year hosting the Finals. Newscaster Soledad O'Brien took his place the following year, moderating the bee in 2014 and 2015. O'Brien was then replaced by Mo Rocca in 2016 and Rocca moderated the Bee.

In 2020, the Bee was cancelled due to the COVID-19 pandemic. The 2021 edition was also cancelled due to a 75% drop in registrations.

Procedure

School competitions
The competition began at the elementary school and middle school levels (4th grade - 8th grade) and usually occurred in November, December, or January. This competition required at least 6 people to enter. Private schools, public schools, and homeschooled students were allowed to enter. Typically, between five and six million students entered each year (any number of competitors could enter this competition). The two major stages in this competition were called the preliminary and the final stages. Often, the preliminary competition was further split into preliminary rounds and a semi-final. In the event of a tie, a tiebreaker round was held at the end of the preliminary rounds.

In the preliminary rounds, competitors were divided into groups of twenty and each contestant is asked one question from each of the seven themed rounds. Categories included:
Cultural Geography
Economic Geography
Across-the-Country, Around-the-World
Science
 Geographic Comparisons
Physical Geography
 Odd-Item-Out (a category where one contestant was given three choices, plus a description; the contestant had to determine which of the three choices does not fit)
Contestants were awarded 1 point per question. At the end of seven rounds, players with the top ten scores advance to the finals. In addition to the game, a player could ask for a repeat of a spelling during these rounds. However, they were restricted to only asking twice in duration of the entire geographic bee.

Quite often there was a tie, in which case a semi-final tiebreaker round was needed. For example, if six players finished the preliminary rounds with eight points and fifteen finished with seven points, the six who finished with eight points automatically advanced to the final competition. The fifteen with seven points moved into the semi-final round where the top four were determined to fill the remainder of the seats in the finals. This was done by asking every player the same question at the same time and giving each player twelve seconds to write down the answer. Each question was automatically repeated twice. Everyone revealed their answer at the end of the twelve seconds and players were eliminated on a single-elimination basis. If, using the above example of four open seats in the finals, there was a question where eight players are left in the semi-final round and three players got the question right, those three advance to the finals. The other five who got the question wrong continued with the single-elimination procedure to determine which competitor would take the last open seat in the finals. A player could not ask judges to spell or repeat words in the semi-final round.

The final competition consisted of two parts: the final round and the championship round. Each of the ten finalists started with a clean slate and was eliminated after two incorrect answers. This continued until the number of contestants drops from ten to two and a third-place finisher was determined. A player was not officially eliminated until the end of a series of questions, since if all but one competitor made their second miss in that round, all the players stayed in the competition. Again, a player could ask for a spelling or repeat on any question, but only once per question. Earlier in the round, questions could require oral answers or written answers from all the competitors at one time. Quite often, many of the earlier questions in this round contained visuals as part of the question, such as maps or pictures. Question examples included pictures of state quarters with the name rubbed off and maps of the US with national forests shown and numbered. Contestants, at the time, were given the name of the national forest and had to match states with trees. At the national level, competitions could include items such as flags, musical instruments, hats, and even live animals. After a certain round, all questions required oral answers only.

If there was a tie for the championship round or third place, there would be an elimination round. For example, if four players are left and three made their second mistake, the fourth advances to the championship round and the other three enter the tiebreaker. The moderator then asked each of the three players, at the same time, to write their answers to the same question. In this special round, questions could be repeated by players but they could not ask how to spell a given word. As a result, if one of three responses was correct, the player would rise to the championship round and the other two moved to the tiebreaker round until a third-place winner determined.

In the championship round, both players started with a clean slate again. The moderator asked both contestants the same question at the same time, repeated twice, and both players had fifteen seconds to write their answer. Both players then showed their answers and each player who wrote a correct answer received one point. There were three questions in the championship round. The player with the most points at the end was the champion. If both players were tied at the end, the competition entered the championship tiebreaker round. The rules were the same as for the championship round, except that the last player to answer a question incorrectly was the runner-up.

In 2010, National Geographic partnered with mobile development company Concentric Sky to launch a series of official app-based study tools titled Geobee Challenge.

Qualifying Test 

The Qualifying Test was the only part of the bee that is entirely written. Every school champion took this test in order to qualify for the state bee. The test comprised 70 multiple choice questions, to be completed in 60 minutes. The top 100 scorers in each state or territory advanced to the state level competition. Beginning with the 2016 Bee, the Qualifying test was administered online rather than on paper.

State and national competitions
The winner of each school-level competition takes an online test, and the top 100 in each state or territory qualify for the State Bee. If there is a tie in the State Qualifying Test, all students in the tie get an invitation to the State Bee (i.e. there were 107 State Bee Qualifiers in the 2019 Michigan State Geographic Bee). The rules at the state level are same as that at the school level, except that there are eight preliminary rounds instead of seven and each player is limited to two repeats or spelling for all eight preliminary rounds. Players are also limited to two repeats or spellings in the final round if they qualify. All the state bees are held on the same date, at the same time (in early April or late March) at all locations. State bees originally occurred for the fifty states, five U.S. territories (Guam, Puerto Rico, US Virgin Islands, American Samoa, Northern Mariana Islands), Washington, D.C., and the Department of Defense Dependent Schools (DoDDS), for a total of 57. In 1999, the state competitions for Guam, American Samoa, and Northern Mariana Islands were merged into one state competition known as the Pacific Territories, bringing the number down to 55. In 2009, the Puerto Rico and US Virgin Islands competitions were merged into a single competition known as the Atlantic Territories, and since then there have only been 54 state and territory competitions. For completions that involve students spread out across wide areas, such as the competitions like the DoDDS and Pacific Territories competitions, there is no in person competition such as in other states. Instead, after winning the school bee, school champions from around these territories take a series of online tests to determine the territory champion. The third-place finisher from each state receives $100, the second-place finisher $300, and the winner $1000. The 54 state champions receive an all-expense-paid trip to Washington, D.C., for the national competition.

The rules at the national level are the same as those at the state, except that there are ten preliminary rounds instead of eight. There was previously a video part of the preliminary competition where students submitted a video worth six points, but was replaced by a written "GeoChallenge" worth ten points. The championship round can also consist of five questions instead of three. The competition is held over four days, with the preliminary rounds on the first day and the final rounds on the third. The national finals are held in late May at National Geographic Society headquarters in Washington, D.C. and are hosted by Mo Rocca. The ten finalists are guaranteed $1000. The third-place finisher receives a $5,000 college scholarship, the second-place finisher receives a $10,000 college scholarship, and the National Champion receives a $25,000 college scholarship, as well as a lifetime membership in the National Geographic Society. From 2009 to 2015, the National Champion also won a trip to the Galápagos Islands. In 2016, National Champion Rishi Nair won a trip to southeast Alaska, including a stop at Glacier Bay National Park. This was because 2016 was the centenary of the U.S. National Park Service. 2017 National Champion, Pranay Varada, received a trip to the Galápagos Islands. The National Competition final round format is also different from state. Originally, it was the same format, but in 2012, National Geographic changed the format so that correct answers were worth points and competitors could earn extra points with bonus questions, with eliminations being every few rounds. In 2015, they changed the format once again. There are no longer bonus questions, and the first five rounds are USA based and worth one point for most questions. The fifth round is a “lightning round” where you are asked three rapid fire questions. Then, four students with the lowest scores are eliminated, a tie being broken with a tiebreaker about estimation. The next four rounds are global and are all worth two points per question, and end again with another lightning round. After this, the top three are left. There are two “GeoChallenges” in the final competition, one worth three points in round 3, and for the top ten a 45-second oral response worth six points. The top two then compete in a normal championship round. In 2019, however, due to the introduction of a new competition that is called the “Geochallenge”(which is about developing a collaborative team project to tackle a given issue) they once again changed the format of the Bee. The Semi-Finals, which consists of the top 10 contestants, is held on one day. There are eight rounds of oral and written questions, and the four lowest scores are eliminated after these eight rounds. Afterwards, there is a “Geochallenge” worth ten points, and three contestants are eliminated to narrow the competition down to the final three. The next day, the top three contestants compete in the finals. They have a series of five oral rounds, and then they have a Geochallenge round and a mapmaker round. Afterwards, the lowest scoring contestant is eliminated, and a normal championship round occurs to determine the champion.

List of moderators

International competition

There was an international competition, which was also moderated by the late Alex Trebek, but it was run differently. The top finishers from each country's national competition formed a team representing their country and participated in an Olympic-style event which included a team written competition and a team oral competition. The 2013 competition was held in Saint Petersburg, Russia. The 2015 National Geographic World Championship, originally planned to take place in Stockholm, Sweden, was canceled, and the competition since has been put on hiatus.

Criticism
Some  argue that the selection process of the National Geographic GeoBee competition is not well designed to reliably promote the most qualified contestants, as it leaves significant room for chance. This is due to the small number of questions and the fact that each contestant answers different questions. Particularly, during the preliminary rounds contestants are eliminated with a single mistake if there are more than 9 perfect scores.
The fact that a single mistake is not a reliable indicator for a contestant's overall strength was demonstrated during the 2014 National competition. The preliminary rounds resulted in 9 contestants with perfect score who accordingly became finalists. The 10th spot was filled by tie breaker rounds between contestants who made a single mistake during the preliminaries and went to the Virginia champion Akhil Rekulapelli, who then went on to win the finals. Again in 2019, Nihar Janga was involved in a tiebreaker to advance to the top 10, and he went on to win the entire competition. Some  also argue that the Geobee is becoming too focused on Geochallenge rounds instead of standard geography questions. This was demonstrated in 2019, where more than half the total points in the semifinal and final rounds were based on these open ended "Geochallenge" questions. Some also criticize the gender imbalance of the Geobee; only two girls have ever won the contest.

Champions

National Champions
Of the thirty-one National Geographic GeoBee champions, twenty-nine have been male and two were female. Five each are from the states of Texas & Washington, four are from the state of Michigan, two each from Florida, Kansas & New Jersey and various other states have been home to one champion each.

States by National Champions

Recent competitions
 2019 competition
 2018 competition
 2017 competition

References

External links
 National Geographic Bee Official Website